Andrea Paolucci (born 23 November 1986) is an Italian footballer who plays as a midfielder for  club Virtus Entella.

Career
Born in Pescara, Abruzzo, Paolucci joined Fiorentina on 31 January 2006. He was a member of the youth team, losing to Juventus in the final. He remained in the Primavera under-20 team as overage player in 2006–07 and 2007–08 season.

He left for Cesena in January 2008 and then to Taranto. However, he was injured in his knee cruciate ligament. He missed 5 months.

In August 2009 he left for Andria BAT. On 15 July 2010 Andria bought him in co-ownership deal for a peppercorn fee of €500.

On 24 January 2012 Cittadella buy the half that belonged at Andria BAT for €80,000. On 23 June he is purchased entirely by Cittadella.

Personal life
His younger brother Lorenzo Paolucci is also a football player.

References

External links

1986 births
Living people
Sportspeople from Pescara
Footballers from Abruzzo
Italian footballers
Association football midfielders
Serie B players
Serie C players
Delfino Pescara 1936 players
ACF Fiorentina players
A.C. Cesena players
Taranto F.C. 1927 players
S.S. Fidelis Andria 1928 players
A.S. Cittadella players
Ternana Calcio players
Virtus Entella players